Deh Abbas (also Romanized as Deh ‘Abbās; also known as Dīvgah-e Bībīān and Dīvkah-e Bībīān) is a village in Dasht-e Hor Rural District, in the Central District of Salas-e Babajani County, Kermanshah Province, Iran. At the 2006 census, its population was 70, in 13 families.

References 

Populated places in Salas-e Babajani County